James F. Callahan was an American attorney and businessman who was the owner of the Pittsburgh Yellow Jackets and later the Pittsburgh Pirates of the National Hockey League.

Career 
In 1925, the Yellow Jackets were owned by former referee Roy Schooley. After winning the US Amateur Championship in 1924 and 1925, the Yellow Jackets are sold to Callahan who wanted to get the team into a professional league. Schooley sold the team to Callahan due to financial hardships. Callahan changed the team's name to the Pittsburgh Pirates, borrowing the nickname from Pittsburgh's professional baseball team. Callahan was able to use the Pirates nickname after he cashed in favor from Pirates owner, Barney Dreyfuss. The Pirates became the NHL's third team in the United States on November 7, 1925, joining the New York Americans and the Boston Bruins. Callahan's brother, who was a member of the Pittsburgh Police Department, offered used emblems from police jackets to place on the uniform sleeves.

On October 8, 1928, financial problems forced Callahan to sell the team to an ownership group that included Bill Dwyer. However, because he already owned the New York Americans, Dwyer had ex-lightweight boxing champion, Benny Leonard, act as the team's owner.

References

Year of birth missing
Year of death missing
National Hockey League owners
Pittsburgh Pirates (NHL)
Sportspeople from Pittsburgh
Ice hockey people from Pennsylvania
Pennsylvania lawyers